The All-Japan Artistic Gymnastics Championships are an artistic gymnastics competition, hosted by the Japan Gymnastic Association. The first edition took place in 1947, and the championships has been held annually since then.

Winners

Individual All-Around 
{| class="wikitable"
|- style="background:#efefef"
! No.
! Year
! Location
! Men
! Women
|-
| 1 || 1947 || Kanazawa || rowspan="5"|Masao Takemoto || rowspan="2"|Tomiko Suzuki
|-
| 2 || 1948 || Tokyo
|-
| 3 || 1949 || Yokohama || Fusako Wakabayashi
|-
| 4 || 1950 || Kanagawa || Tomiko Suzuki
|-
| 5 || 1951 || Mito || rowspan="2"|Hiroko Ikeda
|-
| 6 || 1952 || Osaka || rowspan="2"|Takashi Ono
|-
| 7 || 1953 || rowspan="2"|Tokyo || Keiko Tanaka
|-
| 8 || 1954 || rowspan="2"|Masao Takemoto || Kyoko Sawamura
|-
| 9 || 1955 || Akita || Keiko Tanaka
|-
| 10 || 1956 || Tokyo || rowspan="5"|Takashi Ono || Hiroko Ikeda
|-
| 11 || 1957 || Kanagawa || rowspan="2"|Keiko Tanaka
|-
| 12 || 1958 || Kumamoto
|-
| 13 || 1959 || Okayama || rowspan="3"|Keiko Ikeda
|-
| 14 || 1960 || Tokyo
|-
| 15 || 1961 || Nagasaki || Nobuyuki Aihara
|-   
| 16 || 1962 || Niigata || rowspan="4"|Yukio Endo || rowspan="2"|Ginko Abukawa
|-
| 17 || 1963 || Tokyo
|-
| 18 || 1964 || Akita || rowspan="2"|Keiko Ikeda
|-
| 19 || 1965 || Kyoto
|-
| 20 || 1966 || Chiba || Takeshi Katō || Taki Shibuya
|-
| 21 || 1967 || Aichi || rowspan="2"|Akinori Nakayama || Keiko Ikeda
|-
| 22 || 1968 || Morioka || Mitsuko Kandori
|-
| 23 || 1969 || Yamaguchi || Sawao Kato || Chieko Oda
|-
| 24 || 1970 || Kobe || rowspan="2"|Akinori Nakayama || rowspan="2"|Miyuki Matsuhisa
|-
| 25 || 1971 || Kofu
|-
| 26 || 1972 || Yonago || Eizo Kenmotsu || Takako Hasegawa
|-
| 27 || 1973 || Sapporo || Mitsuo Tsukahara || rowspan="3"|Miyuki Matsuhisa
|-
| 28 || 1974 || Okayama || Eizo Kenmotsu
|-
| 29 || 1975 || Nagano || Mitsuo TsukaharaHiroshi Kajiyama
|-
| 30 || 1976 || Mito || Eizo Kenmotsu || Satoko Okazaki
|-
| 31 || 1977 || Shizuoka || Shigeru Kasamatsu|| Ayako Akabane
|-
| 32 || 1978 || Kitakyushu || Hajime Mikami || Yayoi Kano
|-
| 33 || 1979 || Hachioji || Toshiomi Nishikii || Ayako Akabane
|-
| 34 || 1980 || Isesaki || rowspan="3"|Kōji Gushiken|| rowspan="2"|Yayoi Kano
|-
| 35 || 1981 || Karatsu
|-
| 36 || 1982 || Maebashi || rowspan="2"|Maiko Morio
|-
| 37 || 1983 || Kashihara || Kyoji Yamawaki
|- 
| 38 || 1984 || Kobe || Kōji Gushiken || rowspan="2"|Noriko Mochizuki
|-
| 39 || 1985 || Kofu || Kyoji Yamawaki
|-
| 40 || 1986 || Sasebo || rowspan="2"|Koichi Mizushima || rowspan="2"|Miho Shinoda
|-
| 41 || 1987 || Hyūga
|-
| 42 || 1988 || Sendai || rowspan="2"|Toshiharu Sato || rowspan="5"|Mari Kosuge
|-
| 43 || 1989 || Kitakyushu
|-
| 44 || 1990 || Komatsu || rowspan="2"|Daisuke Nishikawa
|-
| 45 || 1991 || Yamagata
|-
| 46 || 1992 || Takamatsu || Yutaka Aihara
|-
| 47 || 1993 || Nagoya || Yoshiaki Hatakeda ||Hanako Miura
|-
| 48 || 1994 || Koriyama || Hikaru Tanaka ||Risa Sugawara
|-
| 49 || 1995 || Hiroshima || Yoshiaki Hatakeda|| Miho Hashiguchi
|-
| 50 || 1996 || Osaka || rowspan="5"|Naoya Tsukahara || Risa SugawaraYuki Ohata
|-
| 51 || 1997 || Kanagawa || rowspan="3"|Risa Sugawara
|-
| 52 || 1998 || Kumamoto
|-
| 53 || 1999 || Toyama
|-
| 54 || 2000 || Sendai || Miho Takenaka
|-
| 55 || 2001 || Kochi || rowspan="2"|Hiroyuki Tomita || Erika Mizoguchi
|-
| 56 || 2002 || Shizuoka || rowspan="2"|Minami Ishizaka
|-
| 57 || 2003 || Kumagai || Isao Yoneda
|-
| 58 || 2004 || Tokyo || rowspan="4"|Hiroyuki Tomita || Chihiro Ichikawa
|-
| 59 || 2005 || Amagasaki || Miki Uemura
|-
| 60 || 2006 || rowspan="2"|Tokyo || Koko TsurumiMiki Uemura
|-
| 61 || 2007 || rowspan="5"|Koko Tsurumi
|-
| 62 || 2008 || Joetsu || rowspan="7"|Kōhei Uchimura
|-
| 63 || 2009 || rowspan="10"|Tokyo
|-
| 64 || 2010
|-
| 65 || 2011
|-
| 66 || 2012 || Rie Tanaka 
|-
| 67 || 2013 || rowspan="2"|Natsumi Sasada
|-
| 68 || 2014
|-
| 69 || 2015 || Kōhei Uchimura || Asuka Teramoto
|-
| 70 || 2016 || rowspan="2"|Kōhei Uchimura || rowspan="3"|Mai Murakami 
|-
| 71 || 2017
|-
| 72 || 2018 || rowspan="2"|Kakeru Tanigawa
|-
| 73 || 2019 || Chōfu || Asuka Teramoto
|-
| 74 || 2020 || rowspan="2"|Takasaki || Kazuma Kaya || rowspan="2"|Mai Murakami
|-
| 75 || 2021 || rowspan="2"|Daiki Hashimoto
|-
| 76 || 2022 || Shibuya || Arisa Kasahara
|-
| 77 || 2023 || || ||
|-
| 78 || 2024 || || ||
|-

References

External links 
 Japan Gymnastics Association official website

National championships in Japan
Japan
Gymnastics competitions in Japan